"Dare" (stylised as "DARE" and " (DARE)") is a song by British virtual band Gorillaz, taken as the second single from their second studio album, Demon Days. The track features Happy Mondays and Black Grape frontman Shaun Ryder, and is sung by Rosie Wilson (also known as Roses Gabor) with backing vocals from Damon Albarn. It peaked at number one on the UK Singles Chart in September 2005, becoming the band's only UK number one. "Dare" additionally reached the top 10 in the Commonwealth of Independent States (CIS), Iceland, Ireland, New Zealand, and Scotland.

Background and release
The CD single of "Dare" was released in the United Kingdom on 29 August 2005. It reached number one in the United Kingdom on 4 September 2005. In the US, it peaked at number 87 on the Billboard Hot 100 on 14 January 2006 and at number eight on the Modern Rock Tracks chart on 4 March 2006.

For this song, English vocalist Roses Gabor (birth name Rosemary "Rosie" Wilson) took over the role of Noodle from Miho Hatori, who had previously sung as the character on the first Gorillaz album.

Chris Evans stated at the 2006 Brit Awards that the song was originally to have been called "It's There", but was changed due to Shaun Ryder's strong Mancunian accent making it sound like he was saying "It's dare." In a 2017 interview with Chris Moyles on Radio X, Ryder confirmed his version of events, that it was him requesting a change to his headphone level, "it's going up, it's going up, it's there!".

In 2016, vocals of the song were interpolated in Friction's song "Dare (Hold It Down)". In 2017, the song was featured in an episode of the British soap opera EastEnders. The song was also featured in the video game Just Dance.

Music video

The music video for "Dare" included an appearance by Shaun Ryder (of Happy Mondays and Black Grape fame, at the request of Damon Albarn) as a giant disembodied head kept alive by machinery in Noodle's wardrobe. In a departure for the band, the song is mostly performed in the video by Noodle, with 2-D, Russel, and Murdoc only appearing in short cameos in the video; 2-D is seen listening into Noodle's room by pressing his ear to the floor, Russel is shown seated on a toilet reading a newspaper directly below Noodle's room and Murdoc appears at the end of the video lying in bed with Shaun Ryder, who wakes up, apparently having dreamt up the entire sequence of the video. A voice beside him growls, "go back to sleep, honey," revealing the voice to belong to Murdoc, after which it is further revealed to be another nightmare. That time, it was actually dreamt by Murdoc, who also wakes up bolt upright in his own bed gasping and panting.

In the commentary, Noodle claims that Murdoc initially protested her doing the entire video by herself, but she countered that she wrote the song and she had seen him show off too much in the "Feel Good Inc." music video. Additionally, Noodle adds that Murdoc was asleep in his Winnebago for the entirety of the shoot up until the final scene.

The video was directed by Jamie Hewlett and Pete Candeland. The video was leaked a few days prior to its 17 July 2005 release on the official Gorillaz website. The video was later recalled from other websites and the final scene was tweaked slightly; Murdoc's Confederate Naval Jack flag was replaced with that of the Jolly Roger. (The version with the Naval Jack is played in some countries, including Canada.)

This video calls back to classic horror movies. In the very beginning of the video we see Gorillaz' 'reject false icons' statue, which one may recognize as Pazuzu, the figurine from The Exorcist and son of the devil. Crows are flying around the building, in a tribute to Alfred Hitchcock's The Birds. Shaun Ryder is depicted as a Frankenstein-like monster who is brought to life as the music begins. Amongst the contraptions that are part of the life support system appear to be two Atari joysticks and a Speak & Spell from the early 1980s. Ryder's head being kept alive is a reference to the movie The Brain That Wouldn't Die. The tube attached to Ryder's cheek switches from side to side as a tribute to the goofs commonly made in early horror movies. When we see Russel sitting on the toilet, he is holding a newspaper with a headline that reads CANNIBAL MASSAKREN, the Danish title of Cannibal Holocaust. The zoom on Noodle's eye at the end of the video is taken directly from Ringu and its American remake, The Ring.

Track listings

UK CD1
 "Dare" – 4:05
 "Clint Eastwood" (live) – 4:31

UK CD2
 "Dare" – 4:05
 "Highway (Under Construction)" – 4:17
 "Dare" (Soulwax remix) – 5:48

UK DVD single
 "Dare" (music video) – 4:47
 "Samba at 13" – 6:24
 "People" – 3:28
 "Dare" (animatic) – 4:20

UK digital single
 "Dare" (DFA remix) – 12:14

European maxi-CD single
 "Dare" – 4:05
 "Highway (Under Construction)" – 4:17
 "Dare" (Soulwax remix) – 5:48
 "Dare" (music video) – 4:47

Japanese CD single
 "Dare" – 4:05
 "Highway (Under Construction)" – 4:17
 "Dare" (Soulwax remix) – 5:48
 "Clint Eastwood" (live) – 4:31
 "Dare" (music video) – 4:47

Australian limited-edition CD single
 "Dare" – 4:05
 "Highway (Under Construction)" – 4:17
 "Dare" (Soulwax remix) – 5:48
 "Feel Good Inc." – 3:42
 "Dare" (music video) – 4:47

US digital single
 "Dare" (Soulwax remix) – 5:48

Personnel
 Roses Gabor – vocals
 Shaun Ryder – additional vocals
 Damon Albarn – additional vocals, synthesizers
 James Dring – drums, drum programming
 Jason Cox – drum programming, mixing, engineering
 Danger Mouse – drum programming, sampled loops, mixing
 Howie Weinberg – mastering
 Steve Sedgwick – mixing assistance

Charts

Weekly charts

Year-end charts

Certifications

Release history

References

2005 singles
2005 songs
British disco songs
Electropop songs
Funk songs
Gorillaz songs
Parlophone singles
Song recordings produced by Danger Mouse (musician)
Songs written by Damon Albarn
UK Singles Chart number-one singles
Virgin Records singles